Vitaly Lilichenko (born 13 February 1976) is a Kazakhstani cross-country skier. He competed in the men's 10 kilometre classical event at the 1998 Winter Olympics.

References

External links
 

1976 births
Living people
Kazakhstani male cross-country skiers
Olympic cross-country skiers of Kazakhstan
Cross-country skiers at the 1998 Winter Olympics
Place of birth missing (living people)
20th-century Kazakhstani people